Palestine is a city in and the seat of Anderson County in the U.S. state of Texas. It was named for Palestine, Illinois, by preacher Daniel Parker, who had migrated from that town.

The city had a 2020 U.S. census population of 18,544, making it the sixth-largest incorporated municipality in Northeast Texas by population. Palestine is a relatively small city located in the Piney Woods, equidistant from the major cities of Dallas, Houston, and Shreveport, Louisiana.

It is notable for its natural environment, and has a notable dogwood blooming season. It has 23 historical sites on the National Register of Historic Places, and was the western terminus of the historic Texas State Railroad. Today this steam-and-diesel railroad museum operates tourist trains between Palestine and Rusk.

History
Indigenous groups such as the Coushatta Indians occupied this area for thousands of years before European encounter. During the years of Spanish and Mexican control of major parts of the Southwest, what became East Texas was lightly settled by Europeans.

Founding
A trading post was established by Anglo Americans here about 1843, and some settlers gathered around it. In 1846, the Texas Legislature created Palestine to serve as a seat for the newly established Anderson County. James R. Fulton, Johnston Shelton, and William Bigelow were hired by the first Anderson County commissioners to survey the surrounding land and lay out a town site. This consisted of a central courthouse square and the surrounding 24 blocks.

The city was named after Palestine, Illinois, as suggested by Daniel Parker, a minister of Pilgrim Church who had migrated with numerous other settlers from that town.

By 1858, Palestine had grown to a population of 2000. An 1861 state almanac showed that the city was connected to the rest of Texas via a tri-weekly stagecoach that served Huntsville, Crockett, and Nacogdoches. In 1861 a joint resolution called for the construction of the "Metropolitan Railroad" from Texarkana to Austin, passing through Palestine, Henderson, and Fairfield. These plans were interrupted when the American Civil War broke out.

In the postwar period, during the Reconstruction era, the timber trade and town growth were stimulated in the 1870s by the construction of a railroad through here. The city had a population of more than 10,000 by 1898.

Railroad

The International Railroad and the Houston and Great Northern Railroad first connected Palestine to the city of Hearne in 1872. Later that year it was connected northeast to Longview. The railroad merged in 1873 to become the International and Great Northern Railroad (IGN).

The IGN later became part of the Missouri Pacific Railroad, then ultimately Union Pacific Railroad. In 1875, IGN president H.M. Hoxie moved to Palestine and built the first Victorian mansion there. Successful merchant owners and railroad executives built other elaborate homes along South Sycamore Street.

The IGN built a major depot in 1892 and a modern passenger coach shop in 1902, making Palestine an important locomotive and coach location. These shops continued to operate until 1954. At that time, the present facility was built, which is exclusively for freight-car repair.

Today, the Palestine Car Shop is one of only two car shops on the Union Pacific Railroad that perform major modifications and repairs to freight cars. The Palestine UP workforce has more than 100 employees.

After the state completed the Rusk Penitentiary near the city of Rusk, the state leased convict labor to the railroad as workers. The railroad originally transported raw materials to the iron smelter located at the Rusk Penitentiary. In 1906, the line reached Maydelle, and by 1909, the line was completed when it reached Palestine.

Regularly scheduled train service ceased in 1921. The line was leased to various railroad companies until 1969, when they abandoned it during national restructuring of the industry. The Texas Legislature adapted the railroad as a state park in 1972, to be devoted to operating trains that showed some of the state's railroad history.

The Texas State Railroad is a state park that allows visitors to ride trains pulled by diesel and steam locomotives between the park's Victorian-style depots and through the forests of East Texas. This short railroad line dates to 1883.

Modern era
In 1914, the county's fifth courthouse was completed. It is still in use. One of the many historical sites is Sacred Heart Catholic Church, which was designed by Nicholas J. Clayton.

In 1928, oil was discovered at Boggy Creek, east of Palestine. The production of oil resources added to and diversified the town's economy. Palestine became a center for oil-well servicing and supplies in support of other producing fields found later elsewhere in Anderson County.

Construction of the earth-filled Blackburn Crossing Dam on the Upper Neches River, creating Lake Palestine as a reliable source of water, was begun in 1960, and completed in 1962. A municipal water authority manages this resource. The dam was enlarged from 1969 to 1972 to 75 feet high, and 5,720 feet long.

About 40% of the content from the 2003 Space Shuttle Columbia disaster was recovered. seven astronauts were killed in the accident. Debris from Columbia was found in and outside Palestine and other East Texas towns. Palestine's NASA Columbia Scientific Balloon Facility (renamed in honor of the shuttle crew), has flown 1,700 high-altitude balloons for universities and research agencies.

On November 15, 2015, a mass shooting took place at a campsite several miles northwest of Palestine. Six people were killed by an intoxicated neighbor who was upset about losing his family's land. The shooter was charged with capital murder. He was convicted and sentenced to death by a Brazos County jury on November 15, 2017.

Geography

Palestine is located near the center of Anderson County at  (31.757925, –95.638473). Several numbered highways converge on the city, including U.S. Highways 79, 84, and 287, plus Texas State highways 19 and 155.

Lake Palestine
Lake Palestine is a freshwater lake created in 1962 by the construction of the Blackburn Crossing dam on the Neches River. A 25,600-acre lake with a total length of 18 miles, 135 miles of shoreline and an average depth of 16.25 ft, it offers an array of freshwater fish species including bass, crappie, and catfish. The Upper Neches River Municipal Water Authority owns and operates Lake Palestine.

The city of Palestine has a water contract for 25 million gallons of water per day. It is served by a channel dam, 13 miles of pipeline, and a water treatment plant which the city operates for water coming into the city.

Climate
The average warmest month is July; the highest recorded temperature was 114 °F in 1954. On average, the coolest month is January, and the lowest recorded temperature was –6 °F in 2021. The maximum average precipitation occurs in October.

Demographics

At the 1850 United States census, Palestine had a population of 2,000; a decade later, its population declined to 1,938, yet has since increased in population since to a historic 18,712 at the 2010 U.S. census. As of the 2020 United States census, there were 18,544 people, 6,560 households, and 4,479 families residing in the city.

As the city's population has grown despite interval declines from 1990 to 2020, its racial and ethnic makeup continues to be dominated by non-Hispanic or non-Latino whites, and Black or African Americans according to official census records. According to the 2020 American Community Survey's 5-year estimates program, roughly 47.6% of the population was non-Hispanic white, and 26.9% Black or African American. Hispanics and Latino Americans of any race made up 22.2% of the population, and residents from two or more races were 2.6%. The official census tabulation and census estimates reflect continued diversification within the United States; in 2000, the racial and ethnic makeup was 64.60% White, 24.77% African American, 0.49% Native American, 0.79% Asian, 0.07% Pacific Islander, 7.90% from other races, and 1.37% from two or more races. Hispanics or Latino Americans of any race were 14.88% of the population.

There was an estimated 6,560 households in Palestine, with the average household size at 2.68; according to 2020 census estimates, there were 4,479 families and the average family size was 3.32. Of the households and families comprising the city's population, 57.9% of housing units were owner-occupied and 42.1% were renter-occupied units. In 2000, there were 6,641 households; 34.9% had children under the age of 18 living with them, 47.2% were married couples living together, 18.0% had a female householder with no husband present, and 31.0% were not families. About 28.0% of all households were made up of individuals, and 13.7% had someone living alone who was 65 years of age or older. The average household size was 2.57 and the average family size was 3.13.

At the 2000 U.S. census, the median income for a household in the city was $30,497, and for a family was $36,806. Males had a median income of $28,331 versus $20,662 for females. The per capita income for the city was $15,514. About 16.6% of families and 20.7% of the population were below the poverty line, including 27.7% of those under age 18 and 14.6% of those age 65 or over. Since the 2020 census, the median household income increased to $40,684 and households paid a median of $817 a month.

Economy
Typical of many rural American communities, Palestine's economy is stimulated by small businesses, and local chains from national and international retailers such as Walmart. The largest employer is the Texas Department of Criminal Justice, which employs more than 3,900. Other significant employers include a thriving medical and healthcare sector that tends to the large population of retirees.

Government

Local government
According to the city's 2016 audited Annual Financial Report, the city's general fund had $13.1 million in revenues, $14.6 million in expenditures, $3.1 million in total assets, $0.4 million in total liabilities, and $6.7 million in cash in investments across all funds. In addition to the city's general fund, the water treatment plant provides potable water to residents. It operates 24 hours per day, 7 days per week, treating and pumping an average of 3 million gallons of water per day between Lake Palestine and city residents.    The water-distribution system employs 26 lift stations and about 275 miles of water lines; wastewater involves roughly 250 miles of sanitary sewer lines.

The current Anderson County Courthouse in Palestine is the fourth building to serve this purpose. C. H. Page and Brothers designed this brick Renaissance Revival brick courthouse, which opened in 1914. Located in downtown Palestine between Fannin and Dechard streets, it was remodeled in the 1980s.

State government
Palestine is represented in the Texas Senate by Republican Robert Nichols, District 3, and in the Texas House of Representatives by Republican Byron Cook, District 8.

National government

At the national level, the two U.S. senators from Texas are Republicans John Cornyn and Ted Cruz; Palestine is part of Texas' US Congressional 5th District, currently represented by Republican Lance Gooden.

Education

Public school districts 

With almost 3,500 students, the Palestine Independent School District is the largest school district in Palestine. The district comprises:
 Palestine High School, grades 9–12
 Palestine Junior High, grades 7–8
 A. M. Story Elementary, grades 4–6
 Southside Primary, grades 2–3
 Northside Early Childhood Center, Pre-K–1

Located on the western edge of the city, the Westwood Independent School District is home to around 1,700 students. It consists of a primary, elementary, junior=high, and high-school campuses.

Westwood Independent School District
 Westwood High School, grades 9–12
 Westwood Junior High, grades 7–8
 Westwood Elementary, grades 3–6
 Westwood Primary, grades K–2

Charter schools 

University Academy, a charter school operated by the University of Texas at Tyler, began in 2012 with grades 3–6, expanding upward to grades 7–12 at the rate of one grade per year. In March 2018, the school had 188 students enrolled, and planned to grow to 600 students. On March 19, 2018, the university announced it would be upgrading the University Academy school building at a cost of $650,000.

A small portion of remote area of the city is also within the Elkhart ISD.

Colleges and universities 

Trinity Valley Community College operates TVCC-Palestine just north of the city limits at the intersection of US 287 and State Highway 19. In addition to offering academic transfer courses, the Palestine campus offers vocational-technical programs in vocational nursing, cosmetology, mid-management, computer science, criminal justice, business and office technology, fire science, legal assistant, emergency medical technician, and paramedic programs, and also trains correctional officers for the Texas Department of Criminal Justice. Continuing education and adult education courses are also offered.

The University of Texas at Tyler also operates a campus in the city. A new, $9.6 million,  campus opened in 2010, fall semester. The UT-Tyler Palestine Campus currently offers courses in nursing.

Media
Palestine is served by the daily Palestine Herald-Press, founded in 1849 as the Palestine Advocate, now owned by Community Newspaper Holdings.

The city is served by the Tyler television broadcast market. The nearest television transmitter to the city is KETK-TV (NBC) located 30 miles away at Mt. Selman. Likewise, most radio stations serving Palestine originate from Tyler, Jacksonville, or Henderson.

Wired internet for the city is primarily provided by Suddenlink and CenturyLink, with Windstream serving rural areas formerly operated by Valor Telecom. In the 2000s, Comcast and AT&T provided DSL service before withdrawing from the local market.

Transportation
Palestine is at a crossroads of several arterial highways:
 U.S. Highway 79 from Austin to the Southwest and continues on to Shreveport to the northeast
 U.S. Highway 84 from Waco to the West and continues on to Louisiana, Mississippi, Alabama and Georgia to the east
 U.S. Highway 287 from Fort Worth to the northwest and continues on to Beaumont and Port Arthur to the southeast
 State Highway 19 from Huntsville to the South and continues on to Athens and Paris
 State Highway 155 emanating from Palestine northeast to Tyler
 Loop 127 is entirely within Palestine
 Loop 256 encircles downtown Palestine

Airport 
Palestine is served by the general aviation Palestine Municipal Airport, located on the northwest edge of the city. Activated in 1942, its FAA identifier is PSN. Its runway 18/36 has a length of 5005 ft, and crosswind runway 9/27 has a length of 4002 ft. It is home to 31 airplanes, mostly single-engined, and is owned and operated by the city. Palestine was served by Trans-Texas Airlines (later known as Texas International Airlines) during the 1940s and 1950s using Douglas DC-3 aircraft. One afternoon flight arrived from Dallas and Tyler continuing on to Lufkin, Beaumont, and Houston, while another aircraft stopped through going the other way. The service was discontinued between 1952 and 1954.

Notable people

 Aaron Aryanpur, (b. 1977) stand-up comedian
 Blacktop Mojo, Rock band
 Smith Ballew, (1902–1984) was an actor, sophisticated singer, orchestra leader, and a western singing star. 
 Steven L. Bennett, Vietnam War (1946–1972) was a United States Air Force pilot who posthumously received the Medal of Honor. 
 Elton Bomer, (b. 1935) is a politician who served as state representative and Texas Secretary of State
 Bill Bradley, (b. 1947) is a former American football coach.
 Guy Brown, (b. 1955) is a former NFL linebacker for the Dallas Cowboys.
 Ivory Lee Brown, (b. 1969) is a former NFL running back for Arizona Cardinals
 Thomas M. Campbell, (1856–1923) was the 24th Governor of Texas. 
 Russ Cotton, (1915–2009) was an NFL quarterback for the Pittsburgh Steelers
 Keith Crawford,  (b. 1970) is a former NFL cornerback for Green Bay Packers
 Oscar Dugey, (1887–1966) was an MLB Second baseman for the 1915 NL Champions Philadelphia Phillies
 Dick H. Guinn, (1918–1980) was a United States Navy Vice admiral. A Navy Cross recipient
 Ben Howard, (1904–1970), was an aviator and aeronautical engineer
 John E. Jackson, state chairman, Louisiana Republican Party, 1929–1934; born in Palestine in 1892
 Jack Pepper, (1902–1979) was a vaudeville dancer, singer, comedian, musician, and later in life a nightclub manager.
 Adrian Peterson, (b. 1985) is an NFL running back known for his years with the Minnesota Vikings, 2012 MVP.  
 John H. Reagan, (1818–1905) US Congressman before and after the Civil War, Confederate Postmaster general, and US Senator after the war, chairman of the Texas Railroad Commission
 James Saxton, (1940–2014) was an All-American NFL halfback for the Dallas Texans
 Todd Staples, (b.1963) is the former two-term Texas Commissioner of Agriculture. 11th Texas Commissioner of Agriculture and former member of both houses of the Texas State Legislature  
 Gene Watson, (b. 1943) is a country music singer, famous for his 1975 hit "Love in the Hot Afternoon,"
 Alliene Brandon Webb, (1910–1965) was a composer, singer, and teacher.
 Whiskey Myers, is a Southern rock/country band.

 Tye Sheridan, (b. 1996), is an American actor and producer.

Notes

References

External links

City of Palestine official website

 
Cities in Anderson County, Texas
Cities in Texas
County seats in Texas
Micropolitan areas of Texas
Populated places established in 1846
1846 establishments in Texas